Steel Trap is a 2007 German horror and thriller film directed by Luis Cámara and starring Georgia Mackenzie, Mark Wilson, Pascal Langdale, Julia Ballard and Joanna Bobin. The musical score was composed by Florian Moser.

Cast
 Georgia Mackenzie
 Mark Wilson
 Pascal Langdale
 Julia Ballard
 Joanna Bobin
 Annabelle Wallis
 Adam Rayner
 Frank Maier
 Svantje Wascher

See also
 Holiday horror

References

External links
 
 

2007 films
German horror thriller films
English-language German films
2007 horror films
2000s horror thriller films
Films shot in Germany
Holiday horror films
Films set around New Year
2000s English-language films
2000s German films